Liberty Square is a public square located in the Lipótváros neighborhood of Budapest, Hungary.

The square is a mix of business and residential. The United States Embassy in Hungary and the historicist style headquarters of the Hungarian National Bank abut the west side of the square. Some buildings on the square are designed in the Art Nouveau style.  Ignác Alpár designed two of the buildings. The square houses monuments to Ronald Reagan and Harry Hill Bandholtz and a monument to the Soviet liberation of Hungary in World War II from Nazi German occupation. In 2020, together with the United States Embassy, it built a large statue of US Pres. George H.W. Bush. Some of the monuments like the WWII liberation sculpture were designed by Károly Antal.

History
A barrack-prison ("Újépület") that previously occupied the space, was the site where Prime Minister Lajos Batthyány was executed in 1849, following the Hungarian Revolution. The building was destroyed in 1897 and the square constructed on the site.

Gallery

References

Belváros-Lipótváros
Squares in Budapest